Iolanthe is a feminine given name, derived from  iólē "violet" and  anthos "flower".

Yolanda (disambiguation), the Spanish form of the name, is also used in English-speaking countries. 
Jolanta, the Eastern European form, is a fairly common name in Poland, the Czech Republic, and Slovakia. 

Other variants include Iolanda, Iolanta, Iolantha, Jolanthe, Yolantha, Yolanthe, Yolley and Yollie.

Iolanthe (or one of its variants) may also refer to:

In the theatre 
Several distinct theatrical works are titled (or have been produced under the title of) Iolanthe.

 Iolanthe is the name of the title character in the 1845 play King René's Daughter.
 Iolanthe; or, The Peer and the Peri, a comic opera by Gilbert and Sullivan, was first produced in London in 1882.
 Tchaikovski's one-act lyric opera Iolanta (Иоланта) premiered in 1892. The story is based on King René's Daughter.
 A play by Jerzy Żuławski in Polish premiered in 1905 as Iloja, which is translated to English as "Iolanthe".

In other media
Jolanthes Hochzeit (Iolanthe's Wedding) by Hermann Sudermann is a play premiered in 1892, later adapted as a novel.
The Ratepayer's Iolanthe (co-written with Ned Sherrin) (1984) is an adaptation of Gilbert and Sullivan's Iolanthe.
Iolanthe is a character in The Six Sacred Stones.
Iolanthe is a character in The Revolt of Aphrodite.
Iolanthe is a character in Dragons of the Highlord Skies.
Iolanthe is a character in the Jack West Jr book series.
Iolanthe is a character in An Owl in a Thornbush.
Iolanthe is a character in the X-Men universe.
Iolanthe is the middle name of the title character in The Fall and Rise of Reginald Perrin.
Iolanthe is a character in Pottermore, who is mentioned as being an ancestor of Harry Potter and granddaughter of Ignotus Peverell.

Other
SS Iolanthe was a ship in the fleet of the Millbrook Steamboat & Trading Co Ltd.
 Iolanthe (Gordon), a heritage-listed house in the Sydney suburb of Gordon, New South Wales, Australia.
Maoricicada iolanthe is an insect species identified by Hudson 1891.
Lebia iolanthe is an insect species identified by Bates, 1883.
Hydriomena iolanthe is a species of moth first identified by Hudson, 1939.
An ancestor of the racehorse Poseidon.

cs:Jolanta
de:Jolante
fi:Jolanda
fr:Yolande
hu:Jolanda
it:Iolanda
ja:ヨランダ
nl:Jolanda
pl:Jolanta
pt:Yolanda
ru:Иоланта
sl:Jolanda

Given names derived from plants or flowers